Ede Magyar (Ede Oszadszki) (Orosháza, 31 January 1877 – Szeged, 5 May 1912) was an architect, nicknamed 'the Hungarian Gaudi' for his similar organic style.

Life and career

The son of Mihály Oszadszki, a cabinet maker, Magyar was three years old when the family changed its name. He became a master builder after studying in Budapest in 1901, and completed further studies abroad. His short but notable career focused on Szeged where he designed the Reök Palace (1907) and numerous other organic buildings. He was only 35 when he committed suicide following disappointment in love. He was buried in Dugonics cemetery where there is a permanent memorial to him tended by the city council since 2004.

Works

Szeged: Burghardt House (Cafe Wien); Schaffer House (1904); Reök Palace (1907); Unger-Mayer House (1911), Reformed Palace

Zenta: Rottmann House (1910); Royal Hotel (1911)

Kaposvár Theatre (1911) with Jozsef Stahl

Hódmezővásárhely: Simon Palace (1910)

Translated from Hungarian Wikipedia.

1877 births
1912 deaths
Hungarian architects
Art Nouveau architects
1912 suicides